Marcia Louise Fudge (born October 29, 1952) is an American attorney and politician serving as the 18th United States Secretary of Housing and Urban Development since 2021. The district includes most of the black-majority precincts between Cleveland and Akron.

Following the death of Stephanie Tubbs Jones in 2008, Fudge ran unopposed in the special election to replace her. She was chair of the Congressional Black Caucus in the 113th Congress. She considered running for Speaker of the United States House of Representatives at the start of the 116th Congress but eventually announced she would back Nancy Pelosi.

Then president-elect Joe Biden nominated Fudge as Secretary of Housing and Urban Development on December 10, 2020. The U.S. Senate Committee on Banking, Housing, and Urban Affairs advanced her nomination by a vote of 17–7 on February 4, 2021. She was confirmed by the United States Senate on March 10, 2021, by a vote of 66–34. She was virtually sworn in by Vice President Kamala Harris on March 10, 2021. Upon taking her oath of office, she became the second African-American woman to serve as secretary of housing and urban development.

Early life and education
Fudge was born in Cleveland, Ohio, on October 29, 1952. A 1971 graduate of Shaker Heights High School, she earned her Bachelor of Science in business from the Ohio State University in 1975. In 1983, she earned a Juris Doctor from the Cleveland State University College of Law.

Early political career
After college, she worked as a law clerk and studied legal research. She also worked in the Cuyahoga County prosecutor's office as Director of Budget and Finance. Fudge has also worked as an auditor for the county's estate tax department and has occasionally served as a visiting judge and as a chief referee for arbitration.

Fudge was the mayor of Warrensville Heights, Ohio, from 2000 to November 18, 2008. Her 1999 campaign was her first run for any elected office. She was the town's first female and first African American mayor.

Fudge served as chief of staff to U.S. Representative Stephanie Tubbs Jones during Jones's first term in Congress. She has also served on the board of trustees for the Cleveland Public Library.

U.S. House of Representatives

Tenure
After Stephanie Tubbs Jones's death on August 20, 2008, a committee of local Democratic leaders selected Fudge as her replacement on the November ballot. This virtually assured her election in the heavily Democratic, black-majority district. Fudge won the November4 general election, defeating Republican Thomas Pekarek with 85% of the vote. She was unopposed in a November 18 special election for the balance of Jones's fifth term, and won with fewer than nine thousand votes cast. She was sworn in on November 19, 2008, giving her almost two months' more seniority than the rest of the 2008 House freshman class.

After the 2018 midterms, Fudge considered running for Speaker of the House in the 2019 election. She later abandoned the bid and supported Nancy Pelosi.

After the 2020 United States presidential election, Fudge and allies including Representative Jim Clyburn argued that she should be appointed as Secretary of Agriculture in the Biden administration. Fudge was quoted as saying, "You know, it's always 'we want to put the Black person in Labor or HUD'." Biden eventually selected Tom Vilsack as his agriculture secretary; he chose Fudge as Secretary of Housing and Urban Development.

Fudge resigned from the House of Representatives after being confirmed by the Senate as Secretary of Housing and Urban Development on March 10, 2021. A special election to replace her was held on November 2, 2021, with Shontel Brown elected to the seat.

Congressional Black Caucus
During a presentation at the Congressional Black Caucus Foundation's 44th Annual Legislative Conference in September 2014, Fudge said the CBC would mobilize Black voters in the 2014 midterm elections by underscoring Republican attacks on President Obama, such as claims that he was not born in the United States.

Committee assignments
 Committee on Agriculture
 Subcommittee on Conservation, Energy, and Forestry
 Subcommittee on Nutrition, Oversight, and Department Operations (Chair)
 Committee on House Administration
 Subcommittee on Elections (Chair)
 Committee on Education and Labor
 Subcommittee on Civil Rights and Human Services

Caucus memberships
 Congressional Arts Caucus
 Congressional Black Caucus
 Congressional Progressive Caucus
 Congressional Asian Pacific American Caucus
 Medicare for All Caucus

Secretary of Housing and Urban Development

On December 10, 2020, President Biden announced his plan to nominate Fudge for Secretary of Housing and Urban Development. She appeared before the Senate Committee on Banking, Housing, and Urban Affairs on January 28, 2021. On February 4, committee chairman Sherrod Brown advanced her nomination after a 17–7 vote in favor.

On March 10, 2021, Fudge was confirmed by the Senate by a vote of 66–34, garnering the support of every senator caucusing with the Democratic Party and 16 senators from the Republican caucus. She was sworn in by Vice President Kamala Harris hours after her confirmation.

Tenure

Hatch Act violation
In March 2021, during a White House press conference, Fudge made comments on the upcoming Senate election in her home state of Ohio suggesting that Democrats could win it. As a result, she was accused of violating the Hatch Act of 1939. After an investigation, the Office of Special Counsel determined she had violated the Hatch Act. Fudge received a warning.

Racial impact of housing problems
In one of her first acts as secretary, Fudge discussed the effects of homelessness on people of color, evictions in the United States, and creating avenues for fair housing with civil rights leaders including Marc Morial and Al Sharpton.

Electoral history

Personal life
Fudge was the president of the Delta Sigma Theta sorority from 1996 to 2000, co-chair of the sorority's National Social Action Commission, and a member of its Greater Cleveland Alumnae Chapter. In 2003, she was a member of the Shaker Heights Alumni Association's Hall of Fame Class.

Fudge has been a member of the Glenville Church of God, and is now a member of Zion Chapel Baptist Church.

In 2015, Fudge wrote a letter asking for leniency in the sentencing of Cleveland politician Lance Mason on felony assault and domestic violence charges. Fudge described Mason as "kind", and wrote that "Lance [...] has assured me that something like this will never happen again." Mason subsequently attacked and killed his ex-wife, in 2018, stabbing her 59 times. After the murder, Fudge released a statement saying she condemned the crimes committed by Mason.

See also
 List of African-American United States representatives
 Women in the United States House of Representatives
 List of African-American United States Cabinet members
 List of female United States Cabinet members

References

External links

 Biography at the United States Department of Housing and Urban Development

 

|-

|-

|-

|-

|-

1952 births
21st-century American politicians
21st-century American women politicians
African-American women lawyers
African-American lawyers
African-American mayors in Ohio
African-American members of the Cabinet of the United States
African-American members of the United States House of Representatives
African-American people in Ohio politics
African-American women in politics
American women lawyers
American lawyers
Articles containing video clips
Baptists from Ohio
Biden administration cabinet members
Cleveland–Marshall College of Law alumni
Delta Sigma Theta members
Democratic Party members of the United States House of Representatives from Ohio
Female members of the United States House of Representatives
Lawyers from Cleveland
Living people
Mayors of places in Ohio
Ohio lawyers
Ohio State University Fisher College of Business alumni
People from Warrensville Heights, Ohio
Politicians from Cleveland
Politicians from Shaker Heights, Ohio
United States Secretaries of Housing and Urban Development
Women mayors of places in Ohio
Women members of the Cabinet of the United States
Delta Sigma Theta presidents
Biden administration personnel